Amy E. Wyss (born May 20, 1971) is a Swiss-American heiress, billionaire and philanthropist. As of March 2022, her net worth was estimated at US$2 billion. She previously served on the board of trustees for the National Outdoor Leadership School as well as the Wyss Foundation, founded by her father Hansjörg Wyss. Wyss and her husband established the LOR Foundation, which is based in Lander, Wyoming, that is dedicated to improving livability in rural locations across the Northwest through conservation activities.

Early life and education
Wyss is the daughter of Hansjörg Wyss, a fellow Swiss billionaire and the founder of the Wyss Foundation. She graduated from Skidmore College with a bachelor's degree in history and government.

Career

From 2008 to 2012, Wyss served on the board of directors of Synthes, the largest manufacturer of implants to mend bone fractures, that also produces surgical power tools and advanced biomaterials. Her father Hansjörg Wyss was the board's chairman. It was sold to Johnson & Johnson in 2012. 

Wyss co-founded the Twirl Toy Store in Taos, New Mexico. She was also a co-founder of the Golden Willows Retreat, a bereavement center in Arroyo Hondo, New Mexico.

Philanthropy
Wyss served on the board of trustees of the National Outdoor Leadership School. She also was a member of the board of directors for the Wyss Foundation, an organization founded by her father to establish and sponsor informal partnerships between private organizations and the United States government that would place large swathes of land under permanent protection in the American West, and to award scholarships for graduate-level education in conservation. The Wyss Foundation also makes significant contributions in the arena of political advocacy. 

In 2007, Wyss and her husband established the LOR Foundation. It gives grants in Taos County, New Mexico, Lander, Wyoming, and Cortez, Colorado, geared toward "elevat[ing] the rural voice and improv[ing] quality of life.

Personal life
Wyss holds dual US-Swiss citizenship. She resides in Wilson, Wyoming. 

She is married to Edward 'Ed' Jaramillo, a native of Taos, New Mexico, and construction project manager who is also a board member of their LOR Foundation and the Wy'East Mountain Academy. They have no children.

References

1970s births
Living people
People from Wilson, Wyoming
People from Taos, New Mexico
Skidmore College alumni
American corporate directors
Swiss corporate directors
American philanthropists
American billionaires
Female billionaires
Swiss billionaires